Wolfgang Tonne (28 February 1918 – 20 April 1943) was a German Luftwaffe military aviator and fighter ace during World War II. He is credited with 122 aerial victories—that is, 122 aerial combat encounters resulting in the destruction of the enemy aircraft—achieved in 641 combat missions. This figure includes 96 aerial victories on the Eastern Front, and further 26 victories over the Western Allies, including one four-engined bomber.

Born in Moßbach, Tonne grew up in the Weimar Republic and Nazi Germany. He joined the military service in the Luftwaffe in 1937. Following flight training, he was posted to Jagdgeschwader 53 (JG 53—53rd Fighter Wing) in 1939. Flying with this wing, Tonne claimed his first aerial victory on 14 May 1940 on the Western Front during the Battle of France. He then fought in the Battle of Britain and Operation Barbarossa, the German invasion of the Soviet Union. In late 1941, his unit was sent to Mediterranean theater. There, he was made Staffelkapitän (squadron leader) of 3. Staffel (3rd squadron) of JG 53 in January 1942. In May 1942, his unit was posted to the Eastern Front were following his 101st aerial victory he was awarded the Knight's Cross of the Iron Cross with Oak Leaves on 24 September 1942. His unit was then ordered to North Africa in October 1942. Tonne was killed in a flying accident on 20 April 1943 at Protville, Tunisia.

Early life and career
Tonne was born on 28 February 1918 in Moßbach, near Schleiz, in Thuringia of the German Empire. His father was a one-room school teacher (Dorfschullehrer). Tonne had a brother who got him interested in flying glider aircraft. In November 1937, Tonne joined the Luftwaffe as an office cadet at the Luftkriegsschule 4 (LKS 4—4th Air War School) near Fürstenfeldbruck. He completed his A/B pilot license, and was promoted to Leutnant (second lieutenant) on 1 September 1939.

World War II
World War II in Europe began on Friday 1 September 1939 when German forces invaded Poland. On 6 December 1939, Tonne was posted to  3. Staffel (3rd Squadron) of Jagdgeschwader 53 (JG 53—53rd Fighter Wing). At the time, the Staffel was commanded by Oberleutnant Wolfgang Lippert and was subordinated to I. Gruppe (1st Group) of JG 53 headed by Hauptmann Lothar von Janson which was based at Darmstadt-Griesheim Airfield. Tonne received the Iron Cross 2nd Class on 18 April 1940. Tonne claimed his first aerial victory over a Royal Air Force (RAF) Bristol Blenheim twin-engined bomber over Sedan from either No. 21, No. 107 or No. 110 Squadron on 14 May 1940 during the Battle of France. On that mission, he was also shot down near Bouillon in combat with Hawker Hurricane fighters. He bailed out of his Messerschmitt Bf 109 E-3 landing in enemy territory but was able to return to his unit uninjured.

Over England and the Channel he was to gain a further three victories by the spring of 1941. I. Gruppe left the English Channel front on 6 June 1941, relocating to Mannheim-Sandhofen Airfield.

Operation Barbarossa and Malta
On 22 June, the Geschwader crossed into Soviet airspace in support of Operation Barbarossa, the invasion of the Soviet Union, which opened the Eastern Front. I. Gruppe took off on its first mission at 3:40 am, escorting Junkers Ju 87 dive bombers. On 24 June 1941, Tonne who had been appointed adjutant in I. Gruppe of JG 53, claimed his first aerial victory when he shot down a Tupolev SB bomber. On 5 July, I. Gruppe moved to an airfield at Dubno. On 11 July, Tonne was wounded in aerial combat when a shell casing entered the cockpit of his Bf 109 F-2 (Werknummer 6728—factory number), hitting him in the face. Following the injury, he crash landed his aircraft near Berdychiv. On 1 October 1941, Tonne was promoted to Oberleutnant (first lieutenant). Flying combat air patrol the next day, Tonne claimed two aerial victories.

In August 1941, I. Gruppe was withdrawn from the Eastern Front and were equipped with the Bf 109 F-4 at Mannheim-Sandhofen Airfield. On 20 September, the Gruppe relocated to the Netherlands where they were based at airfields at Katwijk and Haamstede where they were tasked with patrolling the Dutch airspace. In December 1941, I. Gruppe was moved to Mediterranean air bases at Gela in Sicily where they fought in the aerial battles of the Siege of Malta. On 24 January 1942, Tonne was appointed Staffelkapitän (squadron leader) of 3. Staffel of JG 53. He succeeded Oberleutnant Ulrich Wollschläger. Tonne flew 116 combat missions over Malta, without claiming aerial victories. On 29 April, I. Gruppe flew its last mission over Malta before returning to Germany. In early May, the Gruppe transferred to Schwäbisch Hall for preparations to redeploy on the Eastern Front.

Eastern Front
In early May 1942, I. Gruppe was transferred back to the Eastern Front. Prior to the relocation, the Gruppe received a full complement of 41 factory new Bf 109 F-4 aircraft at Schwäbisch Hall before heading for Prague Ruzyne Airfield on 28 May. The following day, I. Gruppe flew to Kursk. There, the Gruppe supported the German 4th Panzer Army in its advance towards Voronezh during Case Blue, the 1942 strategic summer offensive in southern Russia between 28 June and 24 November 1942.

From 31 May 1942 to 29 September 1942, Tonne flew 155 combat missions and shot down 88 aircraft on the Eastern Front. He received the German Cross in Gold on 21 August. Tonne was awarded the Knight's Cross of the Iron Cross on 6 September 1942 following his 54th aerial victory. The Knight's Cross of the Iron Cross with Oak Leaves were awarded on 24 September for 101 victories. Three other Luftwaffe officers were presented with the Oak Leaves that day by Hitler, Oberleutnant Friedrich-Karl Müller, Leutant Hans Beißwenger and Feldwebel Wilhelm Crinius. Following the presentation, Tonne, Müller and Crinius were ordered to Berlin where they made a propaganda appearance at the "House of the Press". At the same time, I. Gruppe of JG 53 relocated from the Eastern Front to Comiso Airfiled in Sicily where they arrived on 10 October.

North Africa and death

When British forces launched the Second Battle of El Alamein on 23 October, elements of I. Gruppe of JG 53 were ordered to North Africa. He claimed his first victory in this theater on 26 December 1942 shooting down a United States Army Air Forces (USAAF) P-38 Lightning twin-engine fighter. On 28 December leading a flight of six Bf 109 to the Souk-el-Arba Airfield, Tonne shot down a Supermarine Spitfire fighter near the airfield. On 1 January 1943, I. Gruppe flew many missions to Bône harbor, escorting Ju 87 dive bombers. That day, Tonne claimed two Spitfire fighters shot down. The next day, I. Gruppe again escorted Ju 87 dive bombers from II. Gruppe Sturzkampfgeschwader 3 (StG 3—3rd Dive Bomber Wing) and Focke Wulf Fw 190 ground attack aircraft from III. Gruppe of Zerstörergeschwader 2 (ZG 2—2nd Destroyer Wing) to Bône. Durng this mission, Tonne claimed a Spitfire fighter shot down.

Tonne flew 82 combat missions and claimed 21 victories over Tunisia. On 6 March, Tonne was credited with shooting down the RAF No. 93 Squadron Spitfire fighter piloted by Sergeant W.F. Hockey.

On 20 April 1943, Tonne claimed his 122nd aerial victory. Returning from that mission, he was killed in a flying accident over the airfield at Protville in his Bf 109 G-6 /R1 (Werknummer 16523). Tonne had waggled his wings to single an aerial victory claimed. He then pulled his Bf 109 into a steep climb, while turning the aircraft, extending the undercarriage, and sideslipping the excess altitude before touching down. He had executed this risky maneuver many times before but apparently had misjudged his height and at the edge of the airfield. Tonne was posthumously promoted to Major (major). He was temporarily succeeded by Leutnant Rupert Weninger before Oberleutnant Walter Seiz took command of 3. Staffel.

Summary of career

Aerial victory claims
According to US historian David T. Zabecki, Waldmann was credited with 122 aerial victories. Spick also lists him with 122 aerial victories claimed in 641 combat missions, of which 5 victories were claimed during the Battle of France and Britain, 96 on the Eastern Front and 21 over North Africa. Mathews and Foreman, authors of Luftwaffe Aces — Biographies and Victory Claims, researched the German Federal Archives and found records for 120 aerial victory claims, plus six further unconfirmed claims. This figure of confirmed claims includes 95 aerial victories on the Eastern Front and 25 on the Western Front.

Victory claims were logged to a map-reference (PQ = Planquadrat), for example "PQ 49293". These sectors were then subdivided into 36 smaller units to give a location area 3 × 4 km in size.

Awards
 Iron Cross (1939)
 2nd Class (18 April 1940)
 1st Class (23 May 1940)
 Front Flying Clasp of the Luftwaffe for fighter pilots in Gold (5 May 1941)
 Honour Goblet of the Luftwaffe (6 August 1941)
 German Cross in Gold on 21 August 1942 as Oberleutnant in the I./Jagdgeschwader 53
 Knight's Cross of the Iron Cross with Oak Leaves
 Knight's Cross on 6 September 1942 as Oberleutnant and Staffelkapitän of the 3./Jagdgeschwader 53
 128th Oak Leaves on 24 September 1942 as Oberleutnant and Staffelkapitän of the 3./Jagdgeschwader 53

Notes

References

Citations

Bibliography

 
 
 
 
 
 
 
 
 
 
 
 
 
 
 
 
 
 
 
 
 
 
 
 
 
 

1918 births
1943 deaths
German World War II flying aces
Luftwaffe pilots
Recipients of the Gold German Cross
Recipients of the Knight's Cross of the Iron Cross with Oak Leaves
Aviators killed in aviation accidents or incidents
Victims of aviation accidents or incidents in 1943
Military personnel from Thuringia
People from Saale-Orla-Kreis